The military training center is a division within civilian university or other higher education institution, intended for training commissioned officers from among students, currently widespread in Russian Federation. The abbreviation of military training center is MTC.

History
Military training centers appeared with enactment of the Federal Law of 3 August 2018 No.309-FZ which entered into force on 1 January 2019. Previously existing organizational structures conducted military training of students of civilian universities were abolished. On 13 March 2019, the list of 93 civilian institutions of higher education with military training centers was approved by Government of Russia. The Regulations on the military training centers was approved on 3 July 2019.

Mission
Military training centers have 2 main functions:
 Training commissioned officers for active duty
 Graduates are commissioned as a lieutenant (after graduation from their civilian university), are exempted from military draft, but under the conditions of the signed contracts, they are obliged to serve in Russian Armed Forces 3 years at least.
 Training reserve commissioned officers
 Graduates are commissioned as a lieutenant (after graduation from their civilian university), are exempted from military draft, are not to obliged to serve, and are enrolled in mobilization human resource immediately after a graduation. They can join active duty military service or mobilization human reserve (part-time military service) on voluntary basis.

Furthermore, some military training centers pursue programmes of training reserve non-commissioned officers and reserve enlisted personnel, which are reduced curriculums compared to officer's programme. These programmes graduates are commissioned as a sergeant/1st class petty officer (non-commissioned officer programme) or private/seaman (enlisted personnel programme), are exempted from military draft, are not to obliged to serve, and are enrolled in mobilization human resource.

Organizational structure
Typical military training center has following structure:
 Head of military training center
 Deputy head of military training center
 Head of department (each military training center has several departments)
 Chief of educational unit – deputy head of department
 Chief of training cycle – principal teacher (educational unit has 2 cycles minimum)
 leading teachers
 senior teachers
 teachers
 junior teachers
 Head of educational-methodical division
 personnel of educational-methodical division
 Head of logistic and engineering division
 personnel of logistic and engineering division
 Head of transport and production division
 personnel of transport and production division
 secretary-clerk

List of Russian civilian institutions of higher education having military training centers
There are the following civilian institutions of higher education having military training centers in Russia:

Central Military District

Barnaul

 Altai State Technical University

Chelyabinsk

 South Ural State University

Irkutsk

 Irkutsk National Research Technical University
 Irkutsk State University

Kazan

 Kazan National Research Technical University named after A.N. Tupolev
 Kazan National Research Technological University

Krasnoyarsk

 Siberian Federal University
 Siberian State Aerospace University

Kyzyl

 Tuvan State University

Novosibirsk

 Siberian State University of Telecommunications and Informatics

Omsk

 Omsk State Technical University
 Siberian State Automobile and Highway University

Penza

 Penza State University

Samara Oblast

Samara

 Samara National Research University
 Samara State Technical University

Tolyatti

 Togliatti State University

Saratov

 Yuri Gagarin State Technical University of Saratov

Tomsk

 Tomsk Polytechnic University
 Tomsk State University

Ufa

 Ufa State Aviation Technical University

Ulyanovsk

 Ulyanovsk Institute of Civil Aviation

Yekaterinburg

 Ural Federal University

Eastern Military District

Chita

 Transbaikal State University

Khabarovsk Krai

Khabarovsk

 Far Eastern State Transport University

Komsomolsk-on-Amur

 Komsomolsk-on-Amur State University

Petropavlovsk-Kamchatsky

 Kamchatka State Technical University

Ulan-Ude

 East Siberia State University of Technology and Management

Vladivostok

 Far Eastern Federal University
 Maritime State University
 Vladivostok State Medical University

Northern Military District

Murmansk

 Murmansk State Technical University

Southern Military District

Krasnodar Krai

Krasnodar

 Kuban State Agrarian University

Novorossiysk

 State Maritime University

Rostov Oblast

Novocherkassk

 South Russian State Polytechnic University

Rostov-on-Don

 Don State Technical University
 Rostov State Medical University
 Rostov State Transport University
 Southern Federal University

Stavropol

 North-Caucasus Federal University

Vladikavkaz

 North Ossetian State University

Volgograd

 Volgograd State Agrarian University

Territory of Crimea peninsula

Sevastopol

 Sevastopol National Technical University

Simferopol

 Crimean Federal University

Western Military District

Belgorod

 Belgorod Technological University

Ivanovo

 Ivanovo State Power Engineering University

Kostroma

 Kostroma State University

Kursk

 South-West State University

Moscow and Moscow Oblast

Lyubertsy

 Russian Customs Academy

Moscow

 All-Russian State University of Justitia
 Bauman Moscow State Technical University
 Financial University under the Government of the Russian Federation
 First Moscow State Medical University
 Gubkin Russian State University of Oil and Gas
 Higher School of Economics
 Kutafin Moscow State Law University
 Moscow Academy of the Investigative Committee of Russia
 Moscow Automobile and Road Construction State Technical University
 Moscow Aviation Institute
 Moscow Institute of Physics and Technology
 Moscow Power Engineering Institute
 Moscow State Institute of International Relations
 Moscow State Linguistic University
 Moscow State University
 Moscow State University of Civil Engineering
 Moscow State University of Geodesy and Cartography
 Moscow State University of Medicine and Dentistry
 Moscow Technological University (MIREA)
 National Research Nuclear University MEPhI (Moscow Engineering Physics Institute)
 National Research University of Electronic Technology
 Russian State Agrarian University - Moscow Timiryazev Agricultural Academy
 Russian State University of Justice
 Russian University of Transport
 State University of Land Use Planning

Nizhny Novgorod

 N. I. Lobachevsky State University of Nizhny Novgorod

Petrozavodsk

 Petrozavodsk State University

Ryazan

 Ryazan State Radio Engineering University

Saint Petersburg

 Baltic State Technical University
 ITMO University
 Peter the Great St. Petersburg Polytechnic University
 Russian State Hydrometeorological University
 Saint Petersburg Academy of the Investigative Committee of Russia
 Saint Petersburg Electrotechnical University
 Saint Petersburg State Marine Technical University
 Saint Petersburg Mining University
 Saint Petersburg State University
 Saint Petersburg State University of Aerospace Instrumentation
 St. Petersburg State University of Telecommunications
 State University of Maritime and Inland Shipping

Tambov

 Tambov State University

Tula

 Tula State University

Vladimir Oblast

Kovrov

 Kovrov State Technological Academy

Voronezh

 Voronezh State Technical University
 Voronezh State University

References

Military education and training in Russia